Derek Nigel Ernest Blackburn (June 16, 1934 – October 12, 2017) was a Canadian politician, who served as a Member of Parliament from 1971 to 1993. He represented the electoral district of Brant as a member of the New Democratic Party. Blackburn served for a period as the party's Defense critic.

He was raised in Stratford, Ontario and was the son of John and Mabel Blackburn.

First elected in a by-election in 1971, Blackburn was reelected in every subsequent election up to and including the 1988 election. He retired from elected politics in 1993 when he was appointed to the federal Immigration and Refugee Board. Blackburn died on October 12, 2017 at the age of 83.

Electoral record

References

External links

1934 births
2017 deaths
Members of the House of Commons of Canada from Ontario
New Democratic Party MPs
Politicians from Brantford
People from Sault Ste. Marie, Ontario